DWLA-TV (channel 12) is a television station in Legazpi City, Albay, Philippines, airing programming from the GMA network. It is owned and operated by the network's namesake corporate parent alongside GTV outlet DWJB-TV (channel 27). Both stations share transmitter facilities atop Mt. Bariw, Estanza, Legazpi City.

Although identifying as a separate station in its own right, DWLA-TV is considered a straight simulcast of DWAI-TV (channel 7) in Naga City.

History
1982 - DWLA-TV channel 12, the first television station in the Bicol Region, was launched by GMA Network's predecessor Republic Broadcasting System along with the introduction of its GMA Radio-Television Arts ident. It also had a Circle 12 logo in use, in its final years the blue circle 12 logo used was similar to those used by the ABC in some United States cities and later used the rainbow colors of red, yellow, green and blue stripes.
April 30, 1992 - DWLA-TV officially debuted its Rainbow Satellite Network, the ident served as a relay station of the network's flagship station DZBB-TV Channel 7 Manila to viewers in Albay and the Bicol Region with the utilizes a new logo to correspond with the rebranding and a satellite-beaming rainbow in a multicolored striped based on a traditional scheme of red, orange, green, yellow, blue, indigo and violet, with GMA in a metallic form uses a San Serif Century Gothic Extra Bold and analogous gloominess of indigo as its fonts in the letters.
May 16, 1996 - Republic Broadcasting System formally changed its corporate name to GMA Network Incorporated, with GMA now standing for Global Media Arts.
August 10, 2012 - GMA Naga and Legazpi were upgraded to a "super station" and it was called GMA Bicol in its branding, which primarily covers the provinces of Camarines Sur (via Channel 7) and Albay (via Channel 12).
September 17, 2012 – November 7, 2014 - GMA Bicol launched its flagship local newscast Baretang Bikol.
November 10, 2014 - GMA Bicol re-launched its flagship local newscast 24 Oras Bikol.
 April 24, 2015 - GMA Network decided to cancel airing 24 Oras Bikol as part of the strategic streamlining undertaken by the network. The Bicol stations were now downgraded as a relay (satellite-selling) station.
February 1, 2021 - GMA Bicol will re-upgrade as an originating station with the relaunching of their regional newscast Balitang Bicolandia  covered into the following areas of coverage: Camarines Sur, Albay, Catanduanes, Sorsogon, Masbate and Camarines Norte.
September 28, 2022 - GMA Legazpi started its digital test broadcast on UHF Channel 41 covering Legazpi City and the towns of Camalig, Daraga, Manito and Santo Domingo in Albay as well as parts of Camarines Sur.

GMA TV-12 Legazpi Programs
 Word of God Network 
 Peñafrancia Festival (Yearly)
 Balitang Bicolandia - flagship afternoon newscast (simulcast on TV-7 Naga)
 Mornings with GMA Regional TV - flagship morning newscast (simulcast from GMA Dagupan)

Digital television

Digital channels

DWLA-TV's digital signal operates on UHF channel 41 (635.143 MHz) and broadcasts on the following subchannels:

Area Of Coverage

Primary Areas

Legazpi City
Albay

Secondary Areas
 Portion of Camarines Sur
 Portion of Sorsogon

See also
Barangay LS 96.3 Legazpi
List of GMA Network stations

References

GMA Network stations
Television channels and stations established in 1982
Television stations in Albay
Digital television stations in the Philippines